Bellevalia romana is a species of perennial herb in the family Asparagaceae. They have a self-supporting growth form. Individuals can grow to 22 cm.

Sources

References 

Flora of Malta
Scilloideae